Devis Mema (born 13 February 1985, in Korçë) is an Albanian footballer who last played for Tomori Berat in the Albanian First Division.

Career
Mema was born in Korçë but started off his playing career with Partizani Tirana in 2003. He then moved to play for the team of his birthplace, Skënderbeu Korçë. At this club he spent a year and a half after joining in the summer of 2004 and leaving in January 2006 to join Apolonia Fier. He played in Fier for a season and a half and left to join Flamurtari Vlorë in the summer of 2007.

Flamurtari Vlorë
Following his move to the Vlorë club in 2007, Mema has been able to quickly established himself in the first team. He made his debut for the club on the opening day of the season on 25 August 2007 in a home match against KF Tirana. Mema started the game up front with Arlind Rustemi but was substituted in the 70th minute for the player who proved to be the match winner, Franc Veliu. During the 2007–08 season he played a total of 29 league games and became the club's top goalscorer for the season with 9 goals. During the 2008–09 campaign Mema struggled compared to his first season with the club due to injuries and the arrival of fellow Elham Galica and Eleandro Pema. He managed to play just 17 games and scored only 2 goals in the league. However, it was not all bad news for the striker because he did manage to help the team to the victory over KF Tirana in the final of the Albanian Cup. Mema's equaliser came in the 65th minute following good work down the right hand side of the pitch by Hair Zeqiri. Flamurtari Vlorë went on to win the game and the trophy after Hair Zeqiri's goal in injury time.

Honours

Club
 Albanian Cup (1): 2008–09
 Kupa Pavarësia (1): 2009
 Kupa Mbarëkombëtare (1): 2009

References

1985 births
Living people
Footballers from Korçë
Albanian footballers
Association football forwards
FK Partizani Tirana players
KF Skënderbeu Korçë players
KF Apolonia Fier players
Flamurtari Vlorë players
FK Tomori Berat players
Kategoria Superiore players